Ute Lotz-Heumann (born 1966) is a German-American historian specializing in early modern Irish and German history and the history of the European Reformations and Enlightenment. She is the Heiko A. Oberman Professor of Late Medieval and Reformation History at the University of Arizona in Tucson, Arizona.

Education
Lotz-Heumann holds a Ph.D. in History from Humboldt University in Berlin, Germany, where she also received her habilitation in 2010.

Career
She has published extensively in both German and English on topics relating to cultural history, the historiography of the Reformation, and the histories of both Ireland and Germany. Her most recent publication, A Sourcebook of Early Modern European History: Life, Death, and Everything in Between was published by Routledge in 2019. She is currently working on a collaborative international digital humanities project on Shared Churches in Early Modern Europe, along with David Luebke (University of Oregon), Marjorie Elizabeth Plummer (University of Arizona), and Andrew Spicer (Oxford-Brookes University). Lotz-Heumann is well known in the field of Reformation historiography, having been selected to lead a conference at the Herzog August Bibliothek in Germany entitled "The Cultural History of the Reformation: Current Research and Future Perspectives."
She is also a member of the Editorial Board for the scholarly series Studies in Medieval and Reformation Traditions published by Brill.

She is currently the director of the Division for Late Medieval and Reformation Studies at the University of Arizona, and the North American Managing Co-Editor of the Archive for Reformation History.

Selected bibliography 
The German Spa in the Long Eighteenth Century A Cultural History (Routledge, 2021) 
A Sourcebook of Early Modern European History: Life, Death, and Everything in Between (London, New York: Routledge, 2019) 
The Varieties of Memory: The Historiography of the German Reformation  ed. Bruce Gordon
Taking Sides? Colonial and Confessional Mentalités in Early Modern Ireland: Essays in Honour of Karl S. Bottigheimer. Co-editor: Vincent P. Carey. (Dublin: Four Courts Press, 2003) 
Die doppelte Konfessionalisierung in Irland: Konflikt und Koexistenz im 16. und in der ersten Hälfte des 17. Jahrhunderts. Spätmittelalter und Reformation, Neue Reihe, vol. 13. (Tübingen: Mohr Siebeck, 2000) [The Process of Dual Confessionalization in Ireland: Conflict and Coexistence in the Sixteenth and the First Half of the Seventeenth Centuries]

References

External links 
Faculty bio

1966 births
Living people
German medievalists
American medievalists
21st-century American historians
21st-century German historians
Humboldt University of Berlin alumni
University of Arizona faculty
German women historians
American women historians
21st-century German women writers
21st-century American women writers